Hiệp Đức is a district (huyện) of Quảng Nam province in the South Central Coast region of Vietnam. As of 2003 the district had a population of 40,281. The district covers an area of 492 km². The district capital lies at Tân An.

References

Districts of Quảng Nam province